Format of entries is:
 ICAO (IATA) – airport name – airport location

AG - Solomon Islands

AN - Nauru

AY - Papua New Guinea

References

 
  - includes IATA codes
 Aviation Safety Network - IATA and ICAO airport codes

A
Airport designator, ICAO:A
Airport designator, ICAO:A
Airports by ICAO code: A